Anaclasis - A Haunting Gospel Of Malice & Hatred is the fifth album by the Polish death metal band Hate. It was recorded at Hertz Studio, Białystok, Poland during June and July, 2005. And was engineered and mixed by Sławek & Wojtek Wiesławski.

Track listing

Personnel
 Hate
 Adam "Adam The First Sinner" Buszko - vocals, guitars, samples, synths, producer
 Cyprian Konador - bass guitar
 Dariusz "Hellrizer" Zaborowski - drums

 Production
 Krzysztof "Kris" Wawrzak - engineering, co-producer
 Wojciech & Sławomir Wiesłąscy - mixing, mastering, engineering
 Tomasz "Graal" Daniłowicz - layout, design
 Dominik Czerski - photos
 Tomasz Ślęzak - photos

 Note
 Recorded at Hertz Studio, Białystok, Poland during June and July 2005.

References 

2005 albums
Listenable Records albums